My Heart Is Calling is a 1935 British musical film directed by Carmine Gallone and starring Jan Kiepura, Mártha Eggerth and Sonnie Hale. It is the English-language version of the German film My Heart Calls You and the French film Mon cœur t'appelle. It was made at Beaconsfield Studios.

Cast
 Mickey Brantford as member of Rosee Opera Company  
 Mártha Eggerth as Carla  
 Sonnie Hale as Alphonse Rosee  
 Anthony Hankey as member of Rosee Opera Company  
 Anton Imkamp as member of Rosee Opera Company  
 Parry Jones as member of Rosee Opera Company  
 Jan Kiepura as Mario Delmonte  
 Marie Lohr as Manageress of dress salon 
 Percy Parsons as Customs man  
 Frederick Peisley as member of Rosee Opera Company  
 John Singer as Page boy  
 Jeanne Stuart as Margot 
 Ernest Thesiger as Fevrier  
 Hilde von Stolz as member of Rosee Opera Company  
 Hugh Wakefield as Armand Arvelle

References

Bibliography
 Low, Rachael. Filmmaking in 1930s Britain. George Allen & Unwin, 1985.
 Wood, Linda. British Films, 1927-1939. British Film Institute, 1986.

External links

1935 films
British musical films
1935 musical films
Films directed by Carmine Gallone
Films produced by Arnold Pressburger
Films shot at Beaconsfield Studios
Gainsborough Pictures films
British multilingual films
Cine-Allianz films
British black-and-white films
1935 multilingual films
1930s English-language films
1930s British films